Zannier is a surname, most prevalent in Italy and France.

Notable people with this surname include:
 Eduardo Franco Zannier (1945–1989), Uruguayan musician
 Hélène Zannier (born 1972), French politician
 Italo Zannier (born 1932), Italian historian (it)
 Lamberto Zannier (born 1954), Italian diplomat
 Umberto Zannier (born 1957), Italian mathematician

See also
 Groupe Zannier, French company

References